Solec Nowy  is a village in the administrative district of Gmina Przemęt, within Wolsztyn County, Greater Poland Voivodeship, in west-central Poland.

The village has a population of 247.

References

Solec Nowy